Sharon Bryant may refer to:
 Sharon Bryant (politician)
 Sharon Bryant (singer)